Hidetaka (written: 秀孝, 秀貴, 秀隆, 英孝, 英貴, 英峻, 英学, or 英高) is a masculine Japanese given name. Notable people with the name include:

, Japanese footballer
, Japanese samurai
, Japanese video game director
, Japanese mixed martial artist
, Japanese karateka
, Japanese samurai
, Japanese video game designer
, Japanese illustrator
, Japanese badminton player
, Japanese actor

Japanese masculine given names